Romeo and Juliet is an album by flutist Hubert Laws. It was released by Columbia Records and spent several weeks on the Billboard Top LPs & Tapes chart in 1976.

The album is "an adaptation of Tchaikovsky's famous theme with strings and electronic instruments, in a pop vein. The AllMusic reviewer described the album as "Light jazz (with strings, keyboards, voices, etc.) and a classical/Eastern flavor."

Track listing
"Undecided"
"Tryin' to Get the Feeling Again"
"Forlane"
"Romeo and Juliet"
"What Are We Gonna Do"
"Guatemala Connection"

Personnel
Hubert Laws - Flute
Bob James - Fender Rhodes, Clavinet, Keyboards
Eric Gale, Richie Resnicoff, Barry Finnerty, Steve Khan - Guitar
Gary King - Bass
Andy Newmark, Steve Gadd - Drums
Ralph MacDonald - Percussion
Mark Gray - Clavinet, Keyboards
Alan Rubin, Randy Brecker, Jon Faddis, Marvin Stamm, Bernie Glow - Trumpet, Flugelhorn
Allen Ralph, David Taylor, Wayne Andre - Trombone
George Marge, David Sanborn, Howard Johnson, Phil Bodner, Jerry Dodgion, Harvey Estrin - Woodwinds
David Nadien - Concertmaster
Alan Schulman, Alfred Brown, Barry Sinclair, Charles McCracken, Emanuel Green, Emanuel Vardi, Guy Lumia, Harold Kohon, Harry Cykman, Harry Lookofsky, Matthew Raimondi, Max Ellen, Max Pollikoff, Paul Gershman, Seymour Barab - Strings
Denise Wigfall, Kenneth Coles, Robin Wilson, Shirley Thompson, Stanley Stroman - Vocals

Production
Produced, Arranged and Conducted by Bob James
Co-Produced and Engineered by Bob Clearmountain
Engineered by Joe Jorgensen
Vocal Arrangements by Stanley Stroman

References

1976 albums
Hubert Laws albums
Albums produced by Bob James (musician)
Albums produced by Bob Clearmountain
Columbia Records albums